Sangil-dong is a dong, neighbourhood of Gangdong-gu in Seoul, South Korea.

History 
Sangil-dong literally means 'Upper Part' and located geographically higher than Hail-dong(Currently Gangil-dong) where the stream of Genae flows. In 1963, Sangil-dong became a part of Seoul. Until the early 1980s, huge apartments complex named Godeok Jugong Apartments were built by Korea National Housing Corporation (currently Korea Land & Housing Corporation). Sangil-dong Station is the eastern terminus of Seoul Subway Line 5 and also location for Hanyoung Foreign Language High School. Nayeon from Twice was born in Sangil-dong.

Area information 
The current postal code of Sangil-dong is 134-090. 134 is for Gangdong-gu and 090 is for Sangil-dong.

Offices and Buildings
Samsung Engineering has built new headquarters here. Construction began in September 2009. The complex is composed of three buildings and spans an area of more than 27,000 square meters, making it the fifth-biggest corporate estate in the Seoul area.

See also 
 Administrative divisions of Gangdong-gu
Administrative divisions of Seoul
Administrative divisions of South Korea

References

External links
Gangdong-gu official website
Gangdong-gu map at the Gangdong-gu official website
 Gangdong-gu map
 The Sangil dong Resident office

Neighbourhoods of Gangdong District